The 60th Reserve Infantry Division (Korean: 제60동원보병사단) is a military formation of the Republic of Korea Reserve Forces (ROKA). The division is subordinated to the Mobilization Force Command and is headquartered in Goyang City, Gyeonggi Province. Its responsibility is the defense of Seoul.

The division was created on 1 June 1990.

Organization

Headquarters:
Headquarters Battalion
Reconnaissance Battalion
Engineer Battalion
Armor Battalion
Chemical Company		
Signal Battalion
Support Battalion
Medical Battalion
160th Infantry Brigade
161st Infantry Brigade
162nd Infantry Brigade
Artillery Brigade
3 Artillery Battalions (equipped with M101 howitzer)
Artillery Battalion (equipped with M114 howitzer)

See also
Korean Demilitarized Zone

References

InfDiv0060
InfDiv0060SK
Military units and formations established in 1990